Venustiano Carranza Municipality is a municipality in Puebla in south-eastern Mexico.

Benigno Valencia Pérez, who was commander of the municipal police in Venustiano Carranza Municipality, a year earlier, was among the eight state police kidnapped by armed men in Xicotepec, Juan Galindo (municipality), on March 30, 2019.

References

Municipalities of Puebla